PACE may refer to:

Education
 P A College of Engineering, a technical and management institute in India
 Packets of Accelerated Christian Education, a series of workbooks on which the Accelerated Christian Education curriculum is based
 Professional Acknowledgment for Continuing Education, a continuing education credit sponsored by the American Society for Clinical Laboratory Science

Government and law
 Parliamentary Assembly of the Council of Europe, an international parliamentary assembly
 Property Assessed Clean Energy financing, a form of municipal financing of energy efficiency upgrades or renewable energy installations for buildings
 PACE programme, for accelerated prosecution of European patent applications
 Police and Criminal Evidence Act 1984, an Act of Parliament which instituted a legislative framework for the powers of police officers in England and Wales to combat crime
 Police and Criminal Evidence (Northern Ireland) Order 1989, which legislated police powers in Northern Ireland
 Purchase of Agricultural Conservation Easement, a U.S. state-run program concerning the purchases of conservation easements

Medicine
Pacing and Clinical Electrophysiology, a peer-reviewed medical journal
 Furin (also called PACE, for "paired basic amino acid cleaving enzyme"), a protein in humans
 Program of All-Inclusive Care for the Elderly, in the U.S.
 PACE trial (for "progressively accelerating cardiopulmonary exertion"), a controversial study on the effectiveness of different therapies for chronic fatigue syndrome

Organizations
Paper, Allied-Industrial, Chemical and Energy Workers International Union, representing workers in the U.S. and Canada
Parliamentary Assembly of the Council of Europe, the parliamentary arm of an international organisation dedicated to upholding human rights, democracy and the rule of law, and which oversees the European Court of Human Rights
 Partnership for Academic Competition Excellence, a nonprofit organization that runs the National Scholastics Championship
 Project for Advice, Counselling and Education, a London-based charity promoting the health and well-being of lesbians and gay men

Technology
 PACE Award, awarded by Automotive News for breakthrough technologies by automotive suppliers
 National Semiconductor PACE (for "processing and control element"), the first commercial single-chip 16-bit microprocessor
 PACE - Plankton, Aerosol, Cloud, ocean Ecosystem, a NASA Earth observing satellite in design phase, with launch scheduled for 2022.
 Phage-assisted continuous evolution, a protein engineering technique

Music 
 PACE, an alternative pop band based in London, United Kingdom

Other uses
 PACE Award, awarded by Automotive News for breakthrough technologies by automotive suppliers
 PACE - Communication Plan, a planning methodology based on primary, alternate, contingency, and emergency plans
 Central Airport (ICAO code: PACE), a state-owned public-use airport in Central, Alaska, U.S.

See also
 Pace (disambiguation)